Coline (possibly from Aymara q'uli stripes of different colors on the shirt or undershirt which the Andean people wear, -ni a suffix to indicate ownership, "the one with stripes") is a mountain in the Andes of Peru, about  high. It is situated in the Puno Region, El Collao Province, Santa Rosa District, and in the Puno Province, Acora District. It lies northeast of the mountain Arichua.

References

Mountains of Puno Region
Mountains of Peru